John Connolly (8 October 1869 – 13 May 1957) was an Irish sportsperson. He played hurling with his local club Tubberadora and was a member of the Tipperary senior hurling team between 1895 and 1898.

Honours

Tipperary
All-Ireland Senior Hurling Championship (3): 1895, 1896, 1898
Munster Senior Hurling Championship (3): 1895, 1896, 1898

References

1869 births
1957 deaths
Tubberadora hurlers
Tipperary inter-county hurlers
All-Ireland Senior Hurling Championship winners